Patrick Stuart may refer to:
Patrick Stuart (MP) (–1760, Scottish officer in the British Army, Member of Parliament (MP) for Lanarkshire 1750–54
Patrick Stuart (British Army general) (1777–1855), British Army officer, Governor of Malta 1843–47
 James Patrick Stuart (born 1968), known as Patrick Stuart, American actor and voice artist

See also 
 Patrick Stewart (disambiguation)